Thomas Edwin Jones (1891–1953) was an English professional association football player in the years both prior to and after the First World War. He made over 100 appearances in The Football League for Bristol City. He also played over 60 times in the Southern League for Exeter City.

Football career
Jones was born in Tyldesley in 1891 where he played for the local clubs Tyldesley, Atherton and Chorley. A talented rugby League  as a youth, both Wigan and Wakefield Trinity showed an interest in signing him. Jones signed for Bolton Wanderers but does not appear as a player for them. While at Bolton Wanderers, Jones continued to play for Penrith and then Chorley in the Lancashire Combination.

In July 1909 Jones joined Exeter City from Chorley making his Southern League debut at right-back in a 1–2 defeat at Croydon Common on 4 September 1909. Jones made 39 appearances mostly at left-back in 1909–10 as Exeter City finished 18th in the Southern League First Division. He made a further 24 appearances scoring two goals, both penalties, for Exeter City in 1910–11  before Harry Thickett signed Jones for Bristol City in February 1911. He made his debut at left back in the 1–1 draw against Liverpool on 18 February 1911 shortly after Joe Cottle had suffered a broken leg. Jones made three appearances in the First Division in 1910–11 the season that the "Robins" were relegated to the Second Division. He joined Weymouth Town in 1923.

Coaching career
After retiring from playing, "Ted" Jones joined Bristol Rovers as trainer on 21 July 1923, later training both Bristol City and from July 1938 Torquay United. Jones returned to Exeter City in 1926 and spent three seasons as trainer. He died in Birmingham in 1953.

References

1891 births
1953 deaths
English footballers
Bolton Wanderers F.C. players
Exeter City F.C. players
Bristol City F.C. players
Weymouth F.C. players
English Football League players
Southern Football League players
Association football fullbacks
Penrith F.C. players